LATAM Airlines Group S.A. is a Chilean airline holding company headquartered in Santiago, Chile. It is considered the largest airline company in Latin America with subsidiaries in Brazil, Colombia, Ecuador, Paraguay and Peru. The company filed for Chapter 11 bankruptcy in the United States on 26 May 2020, due to economic problems attributed to the impact of the COVID-19 pandemic on aviation. Although LATAM Airlines' headquarters are located in Chile, the carrier is an American depositary receipt and traded on both the Santiago Stock Exchange and New York Stock Exchange at the time of bankruptcy. The company's stock ticker (LTMAQ) was delisted from the NYSE and later moved to the unregulated OTC Markets Pink on 12 June 2020.

History

Merger
Chile's LAN-Chile and Brazil's TAM Linhas Aéreas signed a non-binding agreement to merge on 13 August 2010, followed by a binding agreement on 19 January 2011, and papers to close the merger on 22 June 2012, with TAM Linhas Aéreas' shareholders agreeing to the takeover by LAN Airlines. Enrique Cueto, former CEO of LAN, became the CEO of LATAM; LATAM now has been reworked into being a portmanteau word of "Latin" and "America.  Mauricio Rolim Amaro, formerly vice-chairman of TAM, became LATAM chairman.

Government approvals
The agreement to establish LATAM was approved by Chilean authorities on 21 September 2011, with 11 restrictions. These included transferring four landing slots at São Paulo-Guarulhos International Airport to competitors interested in operating flights to Santiago de Chile's Comodoro Arturo Merino Benítez International Airport, renouncing membership to either the Oneworld or Star Alliance airline alliance, restricting the increase in capacity on flights between Brazil and Chile, and opening code-share possibilities and fidelity program membership to interested competitors. On 14 December 2011, Brazilian authorities approved the agreement, imposing similar restrictions as Chilean authorities: LATAM would have to choose an alliance by August 2012 and frequencies between São Paulo and Santiago de Chile would have to be reduced. At the time, TAM had two pairs of slots while LAN had four. LAN had to relinquish two pairs to competitors interested in using them. On 7 March 2013, LATAM announced its final decision to choose Oneworld as its global airline alliance. As a result, TAM left Star Alliance during the second quarter of 2014 to join Oneworld.

Rebranding
In August 2015, it was announced that all LATAM Airlines Group airlines would fully rebrand as LATAM, with one unified livery to be applied on all aircraft by 2018. The rebranding included all aspects of the business, such as staff uniforms and airport check in facilities. The first of the aircraft were repainted (or delivered new) in the new LATAM livery in April 2016.

2019–2020: Delta stake, Oneworld departure, and Enrique Cueto steps down
On 26 September 2019, Delta Air Lines announced its plans to buy 20% of LATAM for $1.9 billion, to expand Delta's access to the Latin American market. Additionally, Delta undertook to pay LATAM's exit fee from Oneworld and to take delivery of all Airbus A350 XWB aircraft that LATAM had on order. On 1 January 2020, it was reported that Delta Air Lines' acquisition of the 20% stake in LATAM group was completed. Group CEO Enrique Cueto stepped down on 31 March 2020, and was succeeded by Roberto Alvo, the group's then-current Chief Commercial Officer. On 31 January 2020, LATAM announced that it would leave Oneworld three months later on 1 May.

2020: COVID-19 related bankruptcy
On 26 May 2020, LATAM filed for Chapter 11 bankruptcy in the United States due to economic problems attributed to the impact of the COVID-19 pandemic on aviation, although they are currently operating and have been negotiating terms. In August, the company announced its second-quarter results, projecting improved operational prospects. To assist with the COVID-19 pandemic in Peru, the company announced that its subsidiary LATAM Perú would help distribute vaccines to fifteen provinces in Peru for free.

Corporate affairs

Ownership
The company's shareholders, as of December 2022, are:

Operations

As of 31 December 2017, LATAM Airlines Group is one of the largest airline groups in the world in terms of network connections, with its subsidiaries operating a combined fleet of 315 aircraft providing passenger transport services to 137 destinations in 24 countries; and 18 aircraft providing cargo services to 144 destinations in 29 countries.

LATAM's main hubs are Santiago de Chile's Comodoro Arturo Merino Benítez International Airport; Jorge Chávez International Airport in Lima; São Paulo–Guarulhos International Airport; and El Dorado International Airport in Bogotá. The company is exploring the creation of a new hub in northeastern Brazil with the objective of expanding operations between Europe and South America. Bogotá is the hub for the Caribbean.

LATAM Airlines Argentina has announced, that it will cease domestic cargo operations for an indefinite period.

Subsidiary airlines

Current

The airlines majority- and minority-owned by LATAM Airlines Group through the primary airlines' various subsidiaries are as follows:

Former

Fleet
As of December 2022, LATAM Airlines Group owns and operates the following aircraft:

See also
List of airline holding companies

References

External links
LATAM Airlines

 
Airline holding companies
Airlines of Brazil
Airlines of Chile
Companies based in Santiago
Companies that filed for Chapter 11 bankruptcy in 2020
Holding companies established in 2012
Holding companies of Chile
Holding companies of Brazil
Companies listed on the Santiago Stock Exchange
Companies listed on B3 (stock exchange)
Companies formerly listed on the New York Stock Exchange
Companies traded over-the-counter in the United States
Latin American and Caribbean Air Transport Association
Multinational companies headquartered in Chile
TAM Airlines
LAN Airlines
Brazilian companies established in 2012
Chilean companies established in 2012